The God is Not Willing is the first novel of The Witness Trilogy by Canadian author Steven Erikson, set after the events of the Malazan Book of the Fallen. Upon its release, the book was generally praised for its prose, narrative, and worldbuilding.

Development
In a 2019 interview, Erikson states he intends for The Witness Trilogy to be a single novel split into three volumes. Erikson has stated he found The God is Not Willing more difficult to structure than his previous works.

In May 2022, Erikson announced work on a sequel titled No Life Forsaken.

Plot
The novel is set 10 years after the events in the Book of the Fallen and explores aftermath and legacy of Karsa Orlong.

Reception
The novel received positive reviews upon publication. Bill Capossere from Tor.com described the novel as "a lean, sharply honed, and powerful addition to what is already in my mind the preeminent fantasy universe of the last few decades." The review also complimented the "little ways Erikson shows us a changed world."

Fantasy Book Review gave it a 10 out of 10, stating "it is beautiful, it is captivating and utterly enthralling, and it is a high-water mark for literature." Similarly, Grimdark Magazine gave the book 8 out of 10 and described it as "a worthy next step after the mighty Malazan Book of the Fallen. Not as grandiose in scope but still packed with the qualities that I previously adored." Publishers Weekly gave the book a starred review, praising the descriptive prose and details.

References

Malazan Book of the Fallen
Tor Books books
High fantasy novels
2021 Canadian novels
Novels by Steven Erikson
Bantam Books books